The Gaean Reach is a fictional region in space that is a setting for some science fiction by Jack Vance. All of his series and standalone works that are set in a universe evidently including the Gaean Reach,  perhaps set inside it or outside it, have been catalogued as the Gaean Reach series or super-series.

The Gaean Reach includes all worlds colonized by humans, among which trade and travel flow freely for the most part. Its name apparently means "the range (reach) of [the people from] Earth (Gaea)"; it could also be derived from Old English 'rice' (pronounced reech-e), meaning 'realm' (cf. German Reich).  Some of these worlds are advanced and cosmopolitan, such as Alphanor; others, like Thamber, are inhabited by shipwrecked and forgotten people, who have reverted to feudalism.  Some, like the world of Wyst in the Alastor Cluster, are undeniably strange in their culture and customs.

The period of the Gaean Reach spans several centuries, if not millennia, at an indeterminate but very distant time in the future.  Specific dates are given in the early books of the Demon Princes series, but not in the others. The human civilization in the Demon Princes is the Oikumene, which can be seen as a precursor to or variant of the Gaean Reach. The Reach is mentioned in the three Alastor books, the Cadwal Chronicles, Ports of Call and Lurulu. Singleton works are also included, such as Emphyrio, Night Lamp, Maske: Thaery and The Gray Prince, where it is defined as follows: "the Gaean Reach encompasses a perceptible fraction of the galaxy. Trade routes thread space like capillaries in living tissue; thousands of worlds have been colonized, each different from every other, each working its specific change upon those men who live there. Never has the human race been less homogenous."

References

External links
 

Science fiction book series
Fictional astronomical locations
Fictional regions